Aestuariibacter aggregatus is a gram-negative, strictly aerobic, non-spore-forming, catalase- and oxidase-positive, from the genus of Aestuariibacter with a single polar flagellum which was isolated from the Yellow Sea in China.

References

External links
Type strain of Aestuariibacter aggregatus at BacDive -  the Bacterial Diversity Metadatabase

Alteromonadales
Bacteria described in 2010